Longitarsus angorensis is a species of beetle in the subfamily Galerucinae that is endemic to Ankara, Turkey.

References

A
Beetles described in 1985
Endemic fauna of Turkey